Édith Zha (born 1945) is a French author and scriptwriter of comics for adults and children.

Biography
Édith Zha was born in 1945. She studied philosophy.
At the beginning of 1978, Edith Zha met Nella Nobili and they began to collect interviews with workers who loved each other. In 1979, they published Les femmes et l'amour homosexuel (Women and Homosexual Love).

She then became a proofreader in a publishing house. At the same time, she wrote scripts for adult and children's comics, illustrated by Nicole Claveloux. She also writes stories for children.

Works
 Les Femmes et l'amour homosexuel, with Nella Nobili, Hachette, 1979
 Morte-saison et autres récits (Dead Season and Other Stories), with Nicole Claveloux and Elisabeth Salomon.
 La maison sur la digue with Nicole Claveloux
 La Main Verte et autres récits (The Green Hand and Other Stories) with Nicole Claveloux. translated into English by Donald Nicholson-Smith

Awards
 Angoulême International Comics Festival 2020: Prize for Inheritance with Nicole Claveloux
 Prix Artémisia 2020 du Matrimoine with Nicole Claveloux “for the magnificent republication of their works, La Main Verte et autres récits, published by Cornélius.”

References

1945 births
20th-century French women
Living people
French comics artists
French women writers